Eric Powell (born June 6, 1966) is an American politician from Mississippi. A Democrat, Powell was first elected to the Mississippi Senate in November 2007. He was defeated in 2011. He attended Northeast Community College, University of Mississippi and Wingate University.

References

1966 births
Living people
Democratic Party Mississippi state senators
University of Mississippi alumni
People from Red Bay, Alabama
People from Corinth, Mississippi
Wingate University alumni
21st-century American politicians